Year of the Rabbit is the only full-length album from Year of the Rabbit, Ken Andrews' second post-Failure project. A tour accompanied the album in the remainder of 2003.

Track listing
All songs composed by Ken Andrews except where noted.
"Rabbit Hole" – 2:33
"Lie Down" – 4:09
"Last Defense" – 3:29
"Strange Eyes" – 4:32 (Ken Andrews, Dow, Garber, Snyder)
"Absent Stars" – 3:12
"Vaporize" – 4:03
"Let It Go" – 4:14
"Hunted" – 4:36
"River" – 3:12
"Hold Me Up" – 3:14
"Say Goodbye" – 5:00 (Ken Andrews, Garber)

References

2003 albums
Elektra Records albums